Warining Rahayu (born 26 May 2001) is an Indonesian para badminton player.
She won gold medal at the 2017 ASEAN Para Games in Kuala Lumpur, Malaysia.
In 2018, Rahayu claimed her first BWF Para-Badminton International event title at the  Irish Para-Badminton International.

Achievements

ASEAN Para Games 

Women's singles

Women's doubles

Mixed doubles

Asian Youth Para Games 

Girls' singles

BWF Para Badminton World Circuit (2 titles) 

The BWF Para Badminton World Circuit – Grade 2, Level 1, 2 and 3 tournaments has been sanctioned by the  Badminton World Federation from 2022. 

Women's singles 

Women's doubles

International Tournaments (1 title)

Women's singles

References 

Living people
Indonesian female badminton players
Indonesian para-badminton players
2001 births
21st-century Indonesian women

Notes

External links
 Warining Rahayu at BWFpara.tournamentsoftware.com